Jakub Kosowicz (born 3 April 1994) is a Polish male acrobatic gymnast. With partners Tomasz Antonowicz, Wojciech Krysiak and Radoslaw Trojan, Kosowicz achieved 6th in the 2014 Acrobatic Gymnastics World Championships.

References

External links
 

1994 births
Living people
Polish acrobatic gymnasts
Male acrobatic gymnasts
Place of birth missing (living people)